Ivan Lučić (born 17 October 1996) is a Serbian footballer, who plays as a goalkeeper for Železničar Pančevo.

Club career

Early years
Born in Prijepolje, Lučić was with Zemun, Zlatibor Čajetina and Brodarac in early years of his football career. In summer 2014, Lučić returned to his home town and joined Polimlje. He also a short spell in 2015 with Zlatar Nova Varoš, playing in the Drina Zone League. In summer same year, Lučić left the club. At the beginning of 2016, Lučić joined Romanian side Metalul Reșița where he spent next six months, after which he rejoined Zlatibor Čajetina until the end of same year. He also played with FAP in early 2017, making 15 all appearances in the Serbian League West for the second half-season.

Bačka
In summer 2017, Lučić signed with the Serbian SuperLiga club OFK Bačka. Lučić made his professional debut for new club in a match against Vojvodina on 5 August 2017 under coach Dragan Ivanović. During the season, Lučić was usually used as a back-up choice for Nemanja Jevrić under manager Zvezdan Milošević. Lučić kept a clean sheet in first round match of the Serbian Cup, against Mačva Šabac. He was also named as a player of the match in 2–2 draw to Red Star Belgrade at the Slavko Maletin Vava Stadium on 2 December 2017.

Spartak Subotica
At the beginning of 2018, Lučić started training with the Serbian First League side Inđija, and he was planned to stay on loan deal until the end of the 2017–18 campaign. However, as the agreement failed, Lučić later moved to Spartak Subotica as a single player. The transfer had been announced on January 24, and confirmed by the club's president, Dragan Simović in February 2018. He officially promoted on 24 February 2018, penning three-and-a-half year deal with the club. Lučić made his debut for Spartak in 4–0 away defeat against Red Star Belgrade on 5 May 2018. He also played in the last fixture match of the season, against Partizan.

Career statistics

References

External links
 
 
 

1996 births
Living people
People from Prijepolje
Association football goalkeepers
Serbian footballers
Serbian expatriate footballers
FK Polimlje players
CS Sportul Snagov players
FK Zlatibor Čajetina players
FK FAP players
OFK Bačka players
FK Spartak Subotica players
FK Smederevo players
FK Železničar Pančevo players
Serbian SuperLiga players
Serbian First League players
Liga II players
Serbian expatriate sportspeople in Romania
Expatriate footballers in Romania